Eomeigenielloides is a genus of flies in the family Tachinidae.

Species
Eomeigenielloides segestris Reinhard, 1975

Distribution
Mexico.

References

Diptera of North America
Exoristinae
Tachinidae genera
Monotypic Brachycera genera